Klavs Jørn Christensen (born 24 September 1961 in Aarhus) is a Danish sport shooter. He competed in rifle shooting events at the Summer Olympics in 1988 and 1992. He is currently coaching in Singapore as the Rifle Team coach.

Olympic results

References

1961 births
Living people
ISSF rifle shooters
Danish male sport shooters
Shooters at the 1988 Summer Olympics
Shooters at the 1992 Summer Olympics
Olympic shooters of Denmark
Sportspeople from Aarhus
20th-century Danish people